This was the first edition of the doubles tournament. The top two seeds Robin Ammerlaan and Stéphane Houdet met in the final. Ammerlaan won the first tournament with a three set win to seal the championship.

Seeds
 Robin Ammerlaan (champion) 
 Stéphane Houdet (final)

Draw

Finals

External links
 Main Draw

Wheelchair Singles
ABN AMRO World Tennis Tournament, 2009